Christleton is a civil parish in Cheshire West and Chester, England.  It contains 32 buildings that are recorded in the National Heritage List for England as designated listed buildings.  Of these, three are listed at Grade II*, and the others at Grade II.  The largest settlement in the parish is the village of Christleton, and most of the listed buildings are in the village.  These include houses with related structures, the church and items in the churchyard, almshouses, a memorial shelter, and a telephone kiosk.  The Shropshire Union Canal passes through the parish, and three of its bridges are listed.   Also listed is a former hydraulic sewage lift.

Key

Buildings

See also
Listed buildings in Barrow
Listed buildings in Great Boughton
Listed buildings in Guilden Sutton
Listed buildings in Foulk Stapleford
Listed buildings in Huntington
Listed buildings in Huxley

Listed buildings in Rowton
Listed buildings in Tarvin
Listed buildings in Waverton

References
Citations

Sources

 

Listed buildings in Cheshire West and Chester
Lists of listed buildings in Cheshire